Acrocercops trissoptila is a moth of the family Gracillariidae. It is known from India (Gujarat and Maharashtra).

References

trissoptila
Moths described in 1921
Moths of Asia